Naughty Baby may refer to:

 "Naughty Baby", a song from the 1924 musical Primrose
 Naughty Baby (album), a 1989 live album by Maureen McGovern
 Naughty Baby (film), a 1928 silent film